This is a shortened version of the fourteenth chapter of the ICD-9: Congenital Anomalies. It covers ICD codes 740 to 759. The full chapter can be found on pages 417 to 437 of Volume 1, which contains all (sub)categories of the ICD-9. Volume 2 is an alphabetical index of Volume 1. Both volumes can be downloaded for free from the website of the World Health Organization.

Nervous system (740–742)
  Anencephalus and similar anomalies
  Anencephalus
  Spina bifida
  Other congenital anomalies of nervous system
  Microcephalus
  Hydrocephalus

Eye, ear, face and neck (743–744)
  Congenital anomalies of eye
  Anophthalmos
  Clinical anophthalmos unspecified
  Cystic eyeball congenital
  Cryptophthalmos
  Microphthalmos
  Buphthalmos
  Congenital cataract and lens anomalies
  Coloboma and other anomalies of anterior segment
  Aniridia
  Congenital anomalies of posterior segment
  Congenital anomalies of eyelids, lacrimal system, and orbit
  Congenital anomalies of ear, face, and neck
  Anomalies of ear causing impairment of hearing
  Accessory auricle
  Other specified congenital anomalies of ear
  Macrotia
  Microtia
  Unspecified congenital anomaly of ear
  Branchial cleft cyst or fistula; preauricular sinus
  Webbing of neck
  Other specified congenital anomalies of face and neck
  Macrocheilia
  Microcheilia
  Macrostomia
  Microstomia

Circulatory system (745–747)
  Bulbus cordis anomalies and anomalies of cardiac septal closure
  Common truncus
  Transposition of great vessels
  Tetralogy of fallot
  Common ventricle
  Ventricular septal defect
  Atrial septal defect
  Endocardial cushion defects
  Cor biloculare
  Other congenital anomalies of heart
  Tricuspid atresia and stenosis congenital
  Ebstein's anomaly
  Congenital stenosis of aortic valve
  Congenital insufficiency of aortic valve
  Congenital mitral stenosis
  Congenital mitral insufficiency
  Hypoplastic left heart syndrome
  Other specified congenital anomalies of heart
  Subaortic stenosis congenital
  Cor triatriatum
  Infundibular pulmonic stenosis congenital
  Congenital obstructive anomalies of heart not elsewhere classified
  Coronary artery anomaly congenital
  Congenital heart block
  Malposition of heart and cardiac apex
  Other specified congenital anomalies of heart
 Brugada syndrome
  Other congenital anomalies of circulatory system
  Coarctation of aorta
  Interruption of aortic arch
  Other congenital anomalies of aorta
  Congenital anomalies of pulmonary artery
  Congenital anomalies of great veins
  Absence or hypoplasia of umbilical artery
  Arteriovenous malformation, unspec.
  Other specified anomalies of circulatory system
  Congenital anomalies of cerebrovascular system
  Spinal vessel anomaly
  Persistent fetal circulation
  Unspecified congenital anomaly of circulatory system

Respiratory system (748–748)
  Congenital anomalies of respiratory system
  Choanal atresia

Digestive system (749–751)
  Cleft palate
  Cleft palate, unspec.
  Cleft palate w/ cleft lip
  Other congenital anomalies of upper alimentary tract
  Tongue tie
  Other congenital anomalies of tongue
  Other specified congenital anomalies of mouth and pharynx
  Congenital tracheoesophageal fistula esophageal atresia and stenosis
  Other specified congenital anomalies of esophagus
  Congenital hypertrophic pyloric stenosis
  Congenital hiatus hernia
  Other specified congenital anomalies of stomach
  Other specified congenital anomalies of upper alimentary tract
  Unspecified congenital anomaly of upper alimentary tract
  Other congenital anomalies of digestive system
  Meckel's diverticulum
  Congenital atresia and stenosis of small intestine
  Imperforate anus
  Hirschsprung's disease
  Congenital anomalies of intestinal fixation
  Other congenital anomalies of intestine
  Anomalies of gallbladder bile ducts and liver
  Congenital anomalies of pancreas
  Other specified congenital anomalies of digestive system
  Unspecified congenital anomaly of digestive system

Genital organs (752–752)
  Congenital anomalies of genital organs
  Congenital anomalies of ovaries
  Congenital anomalies of fallopian tubes and broad ligaments
  Doubling of uterus
  Other congenital anomalies of uterus
  Anomalies of cervix, vagina, and external female genitalia
  Imperforate hymen
  Cervical agenesis
  Undescended testicle
  Hypospadias and epispadias
  Hypospadias
  Epispadias
  Congenital chordee
  Micropenis
  Indeterminate sex and pseudohermaphroditism

Urinary system (753–753)
  Congenital anomalies of urinary system
  Renal agenesis and dysgenesis
  Cystic kidney disease
  Obstructive defects of renal pelvis and ureter
  Other specified anomalies of kidney
 Renal ectopia
 Horseshoe kidney
  Other specified anomalies of ureter
 Ectopic ureter
  Exstrophy of urinary bladder
  Atresia and stenosis of urethra and bladder neck
  Anomalies of urachus
 Urachal cyst
  Other specified anomalies of bladder and urethra
  Unspecified anomaly of urinary system

Musculoskeletal system (754–756)
  Certain congenital musculoskeletal deformities
  Torticollis, sternomastoid
  Dislocation of hip, unilateral
  Varus deformities of feet
  Talipes equinovarus
  Valgus deformities of feet
  Other specified nonteratogenic anomalies
  Pectus excavatum
  Other congenital anomalies of limbs
  Polydactyly
  Syndactyly
  Other congenital anomalies of upper limb including shoulder girdle
  Madelung's deformity
  Acrocephalosyndactyly
 Apert syndrome
  Limb anomaly, unspec.
  Other congenital musculoskeletal anomalies
  Anomalies of spine
  Spondylolisthesis
  Klippel–Feil syndrome
  Spina bifida occulta
  Cervical rib
  Other congenital anomalies of ribs and sternum
  Chondrodystrophy
  Osteodystrophies
  Osteogenesis imperfecta
  Congenital anomalies of diaphragm
  Congenital anomalies of abdominal wall
  Other specified congenital anomalies of muscle tendon fascia and connective tissue
  Congenital absence of muscle and tendon
  Accessory muscle
  Ehlers–Danlos syndrome

Integument (757–757)
  Congenital anomalies of the integument
  Other specified anomalies of skin
  Birthmarks
  Other specified congenital anomalies of skin
 Bloom syndrome
 Epidermolysis bullosa
 Pseudoxanthoma elasticum
  Supernumerary nipple

Chromosomal anomalies (758–758)
  Chromosomal anomalies
  Down syndrome
  Patau's syndrome
  Edward's syndrome
  Autosomal deletion syndromes
  Cri du chat syndrome
  Velo-cardio-facial syndrome
  Other microdeletions
 Miller–Dieker syndrome
 Smith–Magenis syndrome
  Balanced autosomal translocation in normal individual
  Other conditions due to autosomal anomalies
  Gonadal dysgenesis
 Turner syndrome
 XO syndrome
  Klinefelter syndrome
  Other conditions due to sex chromosome anomalies
 Snyder–Robinson syndrome (SRS)
  Conditions due to anomaly of unspecified chromosome

Other (759–759)
  Other and unspecified congenital anomalies
  Anomalies of spleen, congenital
  Anomalies of adrenal gland, congenital
  Anomalies of other endocrine glands, congenital
  Situs inversus
  Conjoined twins
  Tuberous sclerosis
  Other congenital hamartoses, not elsewhere classified
 Cowden syndrome
  Multiple congenital anomalies, so described
  Other specified congenital anomalies
  Prader-Willi syndrome
  Marfan syndrome
  Fragile X syndrome
  Other specified congenital anomalies
  Congenital anomaly, unspecified

Congenital
International Classification of Diseases